Emerging Voices is an invited, annual competition organized by the Architectural League of New York for North American firms and individuals with distinct design voices and significant bodies of realized work.

List of Emerging Voices

2021

2020

2019

2018

2017

2016

2015

2014

2013

2012

2011

2010

2009

2008

2007

2006

2005

2004

2003

2002

2001

2000

1999

1998

1997

1996

1995

1994

1993

1992

1990

1989

1988

1986

1985

1984

1983

1982

References

American architecture awards
Architecture lists